Virgilio Andrés Drago Burga (1925–1997) was a Peruvian basketball player. He competed in the men's tournament at the 1948 Summer Olympics.

References

External links
 

1925 births
1997 deaths
Peruvian men's basketball players
1954 FIBA World Championship players
Olympic basketball players of Peru
Basketball players at the 1948 Summer Olympics
Place of birth missing
1950 FIBA World Championship players
20th-century Peruvian people